Hestiasula brunneriana is a species of praying mantis in the subfamily Acromantinae in the family Hymenopodidae.

References

Hestiasula
Acromantinae
Insects described in 1871